Girl/Boy EP is a 1996 EP by Richard D. James under the alias Aphex Twin. It was released through Warp on 19 August 1996. It peaked at number 64 on the UK Singles Chart.

Artwork
The sleeve cover features a photograph of a memorial for James' older brother, also called Richard, who died at birth. In a 1996 interview, James said, "My mum was so upset about it when he died that she kept his name on but forgot about him, thinking 'The next boy I have, that'll be him.'"

Critical reception
NME named it the 35th best track of 1996. In 2017, Fact placed it at number 11 on the "50 Best Aphex Twin Tracks of All Time" list.

Track listing

 "Girl/Boy (NLS Mix)" is the same version as "Girl/Boy Song" from Richard D. James Album.

Personnel
Credits adapted from liner notes.

 Richard D. James – production, sleeve
 Johnny Clayton – sleeve

Charts

References

External links
 

1996 EPs
Aphex Twin EPs
Warp (record label) EPs